Abbey Street is located on Dublin's Northside, running from the Customs House and Store Street in the east to Capel Street in the west. The street is served by two Luas light rail stops, one at the Jervis shopping centre and the other near O'Connell Street (Abbey Street Luas stop. About 1 km in length, it is divided into Abbey Street Upper (west end), Middle Abbey Street and  Abbey Street Lower (east end).

History 
Abbey Street was named after the former St Mary's Abbey, which was located in the area from 1139 until 1539. The street first appeared on maps of Dublin in 1728. On John Rocque's 1756 map, the street is divided into Great Abbey Street and Little Abbey Street.

Notable addresses
The National Theatre of Ireland, the Abbey Theatre is located on Abbey Street, and its building also incorporates the basement Peacock Theatre. The remnants of St Mary's Abbey are accessible on Meetinghouse Lane, off Abbey Street.

The former base of the Irish Independent newspaper, 'Independent House,' is located on Middle Abbey Street, although the offices have since moved to nearby Talbot Street. Independent House was formerly the offices of The Nation, a nationalist newspaper. The Royal Hibernian Academy building used to be located in Lower Abbey Street but was destroyed in 1916. In 1900, Maud Gonne founded Inghinidhe na hÉireann (The Daughters of Erin) at 32 Lower Abbey Street.

In 1785, James Napper Tandy stayed at 180 Abbey St. before eventually fleeing to the United States. George Frideric Handel stayed in Abbey Street while in Dublin producing Messiah at Fishamble Street in 1742.

Retail & services

Notable establishments include:
 Arnotts department store, although its main entrance is on Henry Street
 The Jervis shopping centre is, as of 2008, the largest shopping centre in the city centre
 The Academy music venue, formerly Spirit nightclub, 57 Middle Abbey Street. 
 Eason
 Abbey Street Methodist Church where Australian politician, William McMillan lived in his youth.
 The National Lottery offices are on Lower Abbey Street, opposite the Peacock Theatre

See also
List of streets and squares in Dublin

References

External links
Buildings of Abbey Street, from Archiseek
 Abbey Street Methodist Church

Streets in Dublin (city)
Shopping districts and streets in Ireland
Odonyms referring to a building
Odonyms referring to religion
Abbey Street